Ebertfest is an annual film festival held every April in Champaign, Illinois, United States, organized by the College of Media at the University of Illinois. Roger Ebert, the TV and Chicago Sun-Times film critic, was a native of the adjoining town of Urbana, Illinois and is an alumnus of the University. Founded in 1999 as "Roger Ebert's Overlooked Film Festival", this event is the only long-running film festival created by a critic. Despite Ebert's death in 2013, the festival continues to operate based on Ebert's notes and vision for the kinds of films he championed.

The 2020 festival was postponed due to the coronavirus pandemic. The 22nd edition of the event was rescheduled three times, eventually opening on April 20, 2022.

Origins 
The festival is a direct descendant of a program put on at the University of Illinois at Urbana–Champaign in 1997 called Cyberfest which used the supposed birthday of HAL (the computer in the film 2001: A Space Odyssey) to highlight the University's involvement in the history of computers and computing. The film was to be shown as part of Cyberfest, Roger Ebert had agreed to host and actor Gary Lockwood was a special guest.

It was suggested that the film should ideally be shown as it was originally, in 70 mm format. The original plan was to have the screening at the University's performing arts center but time constraints vs. the need to install projection equipment and elaborate six channel sound made this impossible. Someone suggested looking at the Virginia Theatre, as 70 mm films had been shown there in the past. At this point the theatre was in the hands of a local live theatre group and had not run films since sold by a theatre chain. All concerned were pleasantly surprised to learn the chain had left behind not only what is reputed to be the finest 35/70 mm projector made but also the screen and speakers. The rest of the equipment was brought in for the special showing which went perfectly.

Venue 
Since its inception in 1999, Ebertfest has been held at the Virginia Theatre, an old-time movie palace in Champaign built in 1921 and listed on the National Register of Historic Places. The theatre is now owned by the Champaign Park District. Ebert spoke of having attended films at the Virginia while growing up in Champaign-Urbana and attending the University. It was Ebert's intention that all festival attendees see all of the films in a single theatre in order to create a sense of community among film lovers.

In 2014, a bronze statue of Roger Ebert was unveiled outside of the Virginia Theatre as tribute to both Ebert and Ebertfest.

Growth 
Through donations, the Virginia has been able to fully equip its projection and sound system with a second projector, the latest in digital sound equipment and top quality lenses. The theatre's screen is 56 feet wide by 23 feet high, with a viewable image of up to 50 feet wide x 21½ feet high. The main speakers sit directly behind the screen during film presentations and are augmented by 36 surround sound speakers.

Instrumental in these upgrades has been notable Chicago-based projection expert James Bond who doubles as one of the projectionists during the festival.

Capacity 
Since 2013, the Virginia Theatre has a seating capacity of 1,463. The theatre was closed from 2012 until April 2013 for renovations that included replacing all of the seats. Capacity dropped from about 1,550 to 1,463 but the new seats are more comfortable and the theatre offers wheelchair and companion access.

Name change 
In April 2007 it was announced that beginning in 2008 with the tenth festival "Overlooked" would be dropped from the name and subsequent events would be known as "Roger Ebert's Film Festival", but commonly referred to as simply Ebertfest. This did not necessarily indicate any change in the philosophy or theme but simply eliminated the need to explain when current or even unreleased films were included which had sometimes been the case. They had sometimes been jokingly referred to as "pre-overlooked."

Selection criteria 
Unlike typical film festivals, Ebertfest does not accept submissions. Roger Ebert selected films for the festival which in his opinion are excellent, but have been overlooked by the public or by film distribution companies. All films were selected from those that Ebert saw in the course of his normal reviewing work. Since Ebert's death, all films have been selected by the Festival Committee.

The original purpose of the Overlooked Film Festival, as reflected in the name, was to showcase films that had not been given enough attention by the public, film critics, or even distributors. Ebert had cheerfully admitted that he could bend the definition of "overlooked" to accommodate any film that he would like to include, since entire genres and formats can be overlooked as well as individual films. The selection philosophy is expected to continue, but with the name change there will no longer be a need to come up with a pretext for including any film.

70 mm 
In most years the festival has opened with a film in the 70 mm format. The films may be major releases, like 2001: A Space Odyssey or Patton, or less well-known, like 2005's showing of the French film Playtime. These films were all chosen primarily due to their use of the 70 mm process, which Ebert felt was overlooked.

Silent film 
Each year a silent film is shown with live orchestral accompaniment. The films selected are generally well-known (for example, Nosferatu), but Ebert felt that silent films in general are overlooked by the majority of moviegoers. The festival also strives to include a musical film for the same reason. Performers providing live accompaniment have included the Champaign-Urbana Symphony Orchestra and the Alloy Orchestra.

Festival format 
Twelve to fourteen films are presented at each festival, opening with a single film on a Wednesday night and concluding with a single movie the following Sunday. On each day during the interim three or four films are presented. As of 2019, the format excluded the Sunday screening.

For the first eight festivals, before each screening Roger Ebert would make a few introductory remarks. After the film was shown he would have a discussion on stage with the filmmakers or others connected with the film, sometimes hosting a brief panel discussion.

After Ebert lost his speaking voice due to cancer, starting with the ninth festival in 2007, his wife Chaz assumed many of the hosting duties. Post-show panels are led by his "Far-Flung Correspondents" or other respected film professionals, such as film historian David Bordwell and film critic Christy Lemire.

On April 4, 2013, Ebert died after a long battle with cancer. Despite his death, the film festival went along as scheduled, simultaneously acting as a tribute to Ebert's legacy. At the opening of the 15th annual Ebertfest, it was announced by Ebert's wife, Chaz, that his alma mater, the University of Illinois at Urbana–Champaign, will be establishing a new Film Studies program within the College of Media in honor of his legacy. The program will be funded in part by a $1 million grant from Ebert and his wife to the University. The non-degree program will be both a collection of film-related seminars and classes as well as a platform for Ebertfest to continue.

Festival guests 
Since its inception, many film directors, actors, producers, cinematographers and other crew members, as well as studio executives have been invited to participate in Ebertfest. Examples include Werner Herzog, Spike Lee, and Tilda Swinton.

For the tenth Ebertfest in 2010, many of the international invited guests were unable to attend due to the volcanic eruptions in Iceland that disrupted air travel in Europe.

For the 2022 festival, actor Gilbert Gottfried was scheduled to appear as a panelist to discuss the documentary film about him, Gilbert. In the aftermath of his death on April 12, 2022, Ebertfest announced it was dedicating the event to the memories of Gottfried and Sidney Poitier.

Awards 
As a non-competitive film festival, Ebertfest does not have jury or audience awards. But beginning with the sixth festival in 2004, all invited guests have been given an award originally referred to by Ebert as the Order of the Silver Thumb, but subsequently known as the Golden Thumb Award. The Golden Thumb trophy is a casting of Roger Ebert's thumb in the up position, made by the R.S. Owens & Company, which is the same business that makes the Oscar statuette.

The first Roger Ebert Humanitarian Award was presented in 2016 to co-directors Andrew Young and Stephen Apkon for their documentary film Disturbing the Peace. The film focuses on the work of Combatants for Peace, a group of former Israeli soldiers and Palestinian fighters who put down their weapons and began working together for peace in the region.

In 2017, the second Ebert Humanitarian Award was presented to Norman Lear for "a lifetime of empathy". Lear was the first person to receive the award, because the 2016 award was given to the film Disturbing the Peace. Lear was a special guest at the 2017 festival, to screen the documentary about his life.

In 2019, the third Ebert Humanitarian Award was presented to Morgan Neville for his film Won't You Be My Neighbor?.

Also in 2019, Chaz Ebert presented the first-ever Ebertfest Icon Award to Rita Coburn Whack for the documentary film she co-directed about poet and civil rights activist Maya Angelou, titled Maya Angelou: And Still I Rise.

Academic panel discussions 
Co-sponsored by the University of Illinois College of Media, every Ebertfest since its inception has included panel discussions with invited festival guests and scholars from academia, covering a variety of film-related topics. These discussions are free and open to the public, and are held in the mornings during the festival. From 1999 to 2016, the panels were held on the University of Illinois campus. Beginning in 2017, the panel discussions are held in a hotel close to the Virginia Theatre.

Live streaming 
Beginning in 2010, the panel discussions, film introductions, and post-film discussions/question and answer sessions with festival guests have been streamed live, and then archived on Ebertfest's YouTube channel.

Admission 
Festival goers can purchase tickets to individual shows or full-festival passes. The number of passes sold is limited to 1,000 with the remainder of seats allotted for individual tickets or sponsors. As passholders do not necessarily attend every show, it is often possible to obtain tickets at the last minute after empty seats are counted. At every festival since 2002, all patrons waiting in line for sold-out films were able to gain entry to the theatre.

Passes for the first Ebertfest in 1999 cost $30, and individual film tickets were $5. In 2016, passes cost $150, and individual film tickets were $15. In 2022, passes cost $200 and individual film tickets were $20.

The first sell-out of passes was in 2004.

Festival administration 
Festival founder, programmer and host, 1999–2012: Roger Ebert

Festival producer, 1999–2006: Nancy Casey

Festival producer and host, 2007–present: Chaz Ebert

Festival director, 1999–present: Nate Kohn

Films 
The following is a complete list of films presented at Ebertfest.

2022
Festival schedule

2019
Festival schedule

2018 
Festival schedule

2017 
Festival schedule

2016 
Festival schedule

2015 
Festival schedule

2014 
Festival schedule

2013 
Festival schedule

2012 
Festival schedule

2011 
Festival schedule

2010 
Festival schedule

2009 
Festival schedule

2008 
Festival schedule

2007 
Festival schedule

2006 
Festival schedule

2005 
Festival schedule

2004 
Festival schedule

2003 
Festival schedule

2002 
Festival schedule

2001 
Festival schedule

2000 
Festival schedule

1999 
Festival schedule

External links 

Rotten Tomatoes feature from 2003, archived April 21, 2008
Critic Doctor feature on Ebertfest 2001, archived March 14, 2007

References 

Film festivals in Illinois
University of Illinois Urbana-Champaign
Tourist attractions in Champaign County, Illinois
Film festivals established in 1997
1997 establishments in Illinois
Roger Ebert
Siskel and Ebert